Alex Ronald Bayer (born November 8, 1990) is an American football coach and former tight end. He is currently the special teams coordinator at Bowling Green. He was signed by the Rams as an undrafted free agent in 2014. He played college football at Bowling Green.

High school career
Bayer had six school records at Pickerington High School North, including 50 receptions for 625 yards and two touchdowns his senior season, where he earned honorable mention all-state and also earned first-team All-OCC and first-team all-central district. Ohio Magazine ranked him the 60th ranked recruit and third-best tight end from the state of Ohio, while ESPN.com ranked him as one of the top-75 tight ends in the nation.

College career
Bayer played in all 12 games, making four starts, during his redshirt freshman season. He was named to Phil Steele’s All-Freshman Team (Fifth Team) after recording 22 catches for 298 yards and one touchdown on the season. Played in and started all 12 games in 2011 and had 20 receptions for 242 yards and two touchdowns on the year. He finished 2012 with 36 receptions for 410 yards and three touchdowns. He was named to John Mackey Mid-Season Watch List and was named Third-team All-MAC. During his senior season, Bayer played in and started all 14 games, catching 37 passes for 593 yards and 4 touchdowns. Was named third-team All-MAC as a tight end and played in the East-West Shrine Game in St. Petersburg, Florida, following the season.

Professional career

St. Louis Rams 
Bayer was signed by the St. Louis Rams after going undrafted in 2014 NFL Draft. He played in six games during the 2014 season, recording one fumble recovery. On September 5, 2015, Bayer was released from the St. Louis Rams.

San Diego Chargers 
On September 6, 2015, the San Diego Chargers signed Bayer to their practice squad. On December 9, 2015, Bayer was placed on PS-Injured Reserved and eventually cut ending his short lived NFL career.

Coaching career

Otterbein
Following his playing career, Bayer joined the Otterbein Cardinals football staff as a graduate assistant coaching the tight ends for the 2017 and 2018 seasons. He graduated in April of 2019 with his Master's degree in teaching.

Wake Forest
After his graduation from Otterbein, Bayer reunited with his college coach, Dave Clawson. Bayer joined the Wake Forest staff as a special teams analyst, working closely with the Deac's special teams coordinator and tight ends coach, Wayne Lineburg.

Valparaiso
Bayer spent the 2021 season as the special teams coordinator at Valparaiso. His special teams led the nation in blocked kicks, with nine.

Bowling Green
In January of 2022, Bayer returned to his alma mater, Bowling Green, after being hired by Scot Loeffler as the Falcons' special teams coordinator.

References

External links
Bowling Green Falcons bio
St. Louis Rams bio

1990 births
Living people
Players of American football from Ohio
American football tight ends
Bowling Green Falcons football players
St. Louis Rams players
San Diego Chargers players